Daniel Karl Richter (born October 15, 1954) is an American historian specializing in early American history, especially colonial North America and Native American history before 1800. He is the Roy F. and Jeannette P. Nichols Professor of American History at the University of Pennsylvania and the Richard S. Dunn Director of the McNeil Center for Early American Studies. His book Facing East from Indian Country was a finalist for the Pulitzer Prize in 2002.

Life and career
Daniel Karl Richter was born on October 15, 1954, in Erie, Pennsylvania. He earned his Ph.D. from Columbia University in 1984. Before coming to the University of Pennsylvania, Richter taught at the College of William & Mary and Dickinson College.

Awards
 1993 Ray Allen Billington Award, Organization of American Historians, for The Ordeal of the Longhouse
 1993 Frederick Jackson Turner Award, Organization of American Historians, for The Ordeal of the Longhouse
 1994 Choice Outstanding Academic Book, for The Ordeal of the Longhouse
 2001–02 Louis Gottschalk Prize in Eighteenth-Century History, for Facing East from Indian Country
 2002 Pulitzer Prize finalist for Facing East from Indian Country

Works
The Lords Proprietors: Feudal Dreams in English America, 1660-1689, under contract with Harvard University Press.
Trade, Land, Power: The Struggle for Eastern North America (University of Pennsylvania Press, 2013). .
 Before the Revolution: America’s Ancient Pasts (Harvard University Press, 2011; paperback 2013). . 
 Facing East from Indian Country: A Native History of Early America (Harvard University Press, 2001; paperback 2003). .
 The Ordeal of the Longhouse: The Peoples of the Iroquois League in the Era of European Colonization (University of North Carolina Press, 1992). .
 Friends and Enemies in Penn’s Woods: Colonists, Indians, and the Racial Construction of Pennsylvania, co-editor with William Pencak (Pennsylvania State University Press, 2004). .
 Beyond the Covenant Chain: The Iroquois and Their Neighbors in Indian North America, 1600-1800, co-editor with James H. Merrell (Pennsylvania State University Press, 2003). .

References

21st-century American historians
21st-century American male writers
Historians of Native Americans
Columbia University alumni
Dickinson College faculty
Academics of the University of East Anglia
University of Pennsylvania faculty
University of Pennsylvania historian
Living people
1954 births
American male non-fiction writers